Liberty Mutual Group is an American diversified global insurer and the sixth-largest property and casualty insurer in the United States. It ranks 71st on the Fortune 100 list of largest corporations in the United States based on 2020 revenue. Based in Boston, Massachusetts, and featuring the Statue of Liberty (formally Liberty Enlightening the World) on its logo, it employs over 45,000 people in more than 900 locations throughout the world. As of December 31, 2021, Liberty Mutual Insurance had $156.043 billion in consolidated assets, $128.195 billion in consolidated liabilities and $48.2 billion in annual consolidated revenue. 

The company, founded in 1912, offers a wide range of insurance products and services, including personal automobile, homeowners, workers' compensation, commercial multiple peril, commercial automobile, general liability, global specialty, group disability, fire insurance and surety.

Liberty Mutual Group owns, wholly or in part, local insurance companies in Argentina, Brazil, Chile, China (including Hong Kong), Colombia, Ecuador, India, Ireland, Malaysia, Poland, Portugal, Singapore, Spain, Thailand, Turkey, the United Kingdom, Venezuela, and Vietnam.

In the United States, Liberty Mutual remains a mutual company in which policyholders holding contracts for insurance are considered shareholders in the company. However, Liberty Mutual Group's brand usually operates as a separate entity outside the United States, where a subsidiary is often created in countries where legally recognized mutual-company benefits cannot be enjoyed.

The current CEO is David H. Long. He succeeded his predecessor Edmund (Ted) F. Kelly on June 29, 2011. Kelly was appointed CEO in 1998, and stepped down from the Board of Directors as chairman in April, 2013.

History

Early history 
Liberty Mutual was founded in 1912 as the Massachusetts Employees Insurance Association (MEIA), following passage of a 1911 Massachusetts law requiring employers to protect their employees with workers’ compensation insurance. The company was founded as a mutual company, a structure in which an insurance company is owned by its policyholders. The first branch office was opened in 1914, and later that year, the company wrote its first automobile insurance policy. The name was changed in 1917 to the Liberty Mutual Insurance Company and, through partnerships, the company began offering full-coverage auto policies.

Structural changes 
In 1964, Liberty Mutual Insurance Company began offering life insurance through its Liberty Life Assurance Branch. In 2002, the company converted into its current mutual holding company structure, which would allow it to offer stock while remaining a mutual company. The conversion was controversial, as some policyholders believed the change would dilute their interest in the overall company, reduce their voting control, and limit their dividends. A lawsuit was filed, alleging that information provided to policyholders was misleading. Liberty Mutual settled the lawsuit in December 2001, which required additional disclosure and limited certain compensation to company officers and directors. Despite these concerns, the plan was approved by voting policyholders around November 2001. Leveraging the greater flexibility of the mutual holding company structure, Liberty Mutual transformed from a single-line, highly regional insurer to one of the world's leading property and casualty insurance companies.

Growth and acquisitions 
Liberty Mutual's growth has been both organic and through acquisition. Early acquisitions were small, but Liberty Mutual has made several large acquisitions over the past decade, including the high-profile acquisition of Safeco Corporation in 2008. Liberty Mutual agreed to acquire all outstanding shares of Safeco for $68.25 per share, for a total transaction price of approximately $6.2 billion. The result of this activity was an increase in revenue from $6 billion to over $30 billion in twelve years. In 1999, the company purchased Wausau Insurance Cos.

Liberty Mutual created a 2006 television commercial depicting people doing good for others, reporting that the "overwhelming" positive response led to its decision to create the website The Responsibility Project. Liberty Mutual is the sole corporate sponsor of the long-running PBS documentary series American Experience. In 2011, as part of the company's "Real America" campaign, the company introduced two new commercials featuring Sacagawea and Paul Revere.

In 2011, the company began construction of the Liberty Mutual Tower, a 22-story skyscraper as part a headquarters expansion project. The building received its certificate of occupancy in June 2013. 

In May 2017, Liberty Mutual Insurance completed its acquisition of Bermuda-based Ironshore Inc. from Fosun International Limited for $2.93 billion. In October 2019, Liberty Mutual acquired Nationale Borg, Nationale Borg Reinsurance and AmTrust Insurance Spain, which are credit and surety reinsurance subsidiaries of AmTrust Financial Services.

In July 2021, Liberty agreed to acquire State Auto Group for over $2 billion. In August 2022, Liberty acquired AmGeneral Insurance Berhad, a Malaysia insurance company.

Organizational structure

Strategic business units 
Liberty Mutual conducts all of its business through four strategic business units: US Consumer Markets, Commercial Insurance, Global Consumer Markets and Global Specialty.

US Consumer Markets 
Passenger automobile, homeowners, life, annuity and other property and casualty insurance products are available via Liberty Mutual's US Consumer Markets line. These products are branded under the Liberty Mutual Insurance and Safeco names, and are distributed via a network of more than 2,300 sales professionals. Other distribution means are call centers, third-party producers and the company's own website. Over 10,000 insurance agencies across the U.S. carry Safeco-branded products.

Commercial insurance 
Property and casualty, as well as group benefits commercial insurance products, fall into two distinct categories: Business Insurance and National Insurance. The former caters to businesses with fewer than 1,000 employees, while the latter serves businesses in specific industries or with more than 1,000 employees. Group-benefits products include disability insurance and group life insurance.

Global Consumer Markets 
Localized insurance companies sell Liberty International's products in 18 countries and markets. International products are offered to both individual and business customers, and include property and casualty insurance as well as health and life insurance products. The largest international product offering is passenger automobile insurance for private individuals.

Global Specialty 
The Global Specialty insurance line offers specialty products, such as marine, energy, aviation, professional liability and crisis management, offered through 40 Liberty International Underwriters offices worldwide. In addition, Liberty International Underwriters provides global multi-line insurance and reinsurance written on its Lloyd's Syndicate 4472 platform. Global Specialty also includes reinsurance products offered through Liberty Mutual Reinsurance.

Subsidiary companies 
 Helmsman Management Services
 Liberty County Mutual Insurance Company
 Liberty International Underwriters (LIU)
 Liberty Mutual Surety (LMS)
 Liberty Mutual Reinsurance (LMR)
 Liberty Specialty Markets (LSM)
 Liberty Seguros
 Liberty Mutual Agency Corporation
 American Fire & Casualty
 America First Insurance
 Colorado Casualty
 Consolidated Insurance Company
 Golden Eagle Insurance
 Indiana Insurance
 Liberty Mutual Surety
 Liberty Surety First
 Montgomery Insurance
 Ohio Casualty
 Ohio Security
 West American
 Peerless Insurance
 Safeco
 State Auto Mutual Insurance Companies (acquired in 2022)
 Ironshore (acquired in 2016)
 Peerless Insurance

Liberty Mutual Research Institute for Safety 
Founded in 1954, the Liberty Mutual Research Institute for Safety studied the occupational safety and health of workers. Its scientific contributions include machine safeguarding guidelines, the Cornell-Liberty Survival Car and ergonomic guidelines that have informed the basis for national and international safety standards. More recently, the institute developed the Workplace Safety Index, an annual ranking of the leading causes of the most disabling occupational injuries in the U.S.

The institute's scientists conducted field and laboratory experiments to study the major causes of work-related injury and disability, publishing their results in peer-reviewed scientific literature. Institute findings are the basis for safety programs, recommendations and software used by Liberty Mutual loss-control consultants to help policyholders enhance worker safety. The institute’s work was non-proprietary and available to the public.

The institute closed in May 2017.

Controversy 

In 2006, Liberty Mutual employees in the Los Angeles area sued, claiming that the company had failed to pay their overtime salaries. They attempted to certify a class-action suit, but it was dismissed on technical grounds.

In late 2012, the company won an appeal granting it the ability to not pay employees for work performed on an overtime basis. Liberty Mutual relied on an amicus brief filed on behalf of the U.S. Department of Labor. The court decided, based on the brief, that claims personnel are exempt "administrative employees" and not eligible for overtime pay. In late 2012, the Supreme Court of California depublished a contrary decision on the same issue.

In 2012 and 2013, The Boston Globe published a series of articles concerning Liberty Mutual executives' excessive compensation and weekend trips using the company's fleet of five long-range corporate jets.

Advertising

LiMu Emu, a character that is represented using a real emu as well as through CGI, appears in some of Liberty Mutual's advertising beginning in 2019. LiMu is also accompanied by Doug who tries to keep LiMu from acting up. Doug is played by actor David Hoffman.
On February 9, 2023, Liberty Mutual began advertising as Liberty at the end of its commercials.

References

External links 

 

 
Insurance companies of the United States
Mutual insurance companies of the United States
American companies established in 1912
Financial services companies established in 1912
Companies based in Boston
1912 establishments in Massachusetts.